Pezzota is an Italian surname. Notable people with the surname include:

 Robertino Pezzota (born 1983), Argentinian squash player
 Rodrigo Pezzota (born 1984), Argentinian squash player

Italian-language surnames